Maryon is a surname. Notable people with the surname include:

Edith Maryon (1872–1924), English sculptor
Edward D. Maryon (1931–2005), American painter and educator
Herbert Maryon (1874–1965), English sculptor, goldsmith, and authority on ancient metalwork

See also
Maryon (given name)
Maryon-Wilson baronets